Joan Clark BA, D.Litt. (hon.) (née MacDonald) (born 12 October 1934) is a Canadian fiction author.

Born in Liverpool, Nova Scotia, Clark spent her youth in Nova Scotia and New Brunswick. She attended Acadia University for its drama program, graduating with a Bachelor of Arts degree with English major in 1957. She has worked as a teacher.

Clark moved to Alberta in the early 1960s with her engineer husband and attended the University of Alberta before moving to Calgary in1965. There she started to write stories. She lived in Alberta for two decades. In 1975, she and Edna Alford started the literary journal Dandelion in that province. In 1976, she studied with W. O. Mitchell at the Banff Centre. Clark also served as president of the Writers' Guild of Alberta. She eventually returned to Atlantic Canada in 1985, settling in St. John's, Newfoundland. There she was a founding member of the Writers Alliance of Newfoundland and Labrador.

Clark served on the jury of the 2001 Giller Prize. In 2010 she was made a Member of the Order of Canada. In 2018, An Audience of Chairs, a film adaptation of her novel was released in 2018.

Awards and recognition
 1988: fiction finalist, Governor General's Awards
 1988: finalist, Books in Canada First Novel Award, The Victory of Geraldine Gull
 1991: Marian Engel Award
 1995: Geoffrey Bilson Award, The Dream Carvers
 1998: Honorary Doctor of Letters, Sir Wilfred Grenfell College
 1999: Vicky Metcalf Award
 2003: Geoffrey Bilson Award, The Word for Home
 2006: longlisted for the International Dublin Literary Award, An Audience of Chairs
 2010: Order of Canada

Books
1968: Girl of the Rockies
1971: Thomasina and the Trout Tree (Tundra) 
1977: The Hand of Robin Squires (Clarke, Irwin)  (La main de Robin Squires: le mystere de l'ile aux Chenes, translated by Claude Aubry (P. Tisseyre, 1984) )
Penguin Canada paperback editions: , 
other paperback editions: , 
1982: From a High Thin Wire (NeWest) 
1985: Wild Man of the Woods (Viking Canada) 
Penguin Canada paperback 
1987: The Moons of Madeleine (Viking Kestrel) 
Penguin Canada paperback 
1988: The Victory of Geraldine Gull (Macmillan of Canada) 
1990: Swimming Toward the Light (Macmillan of Canada) 
1993: Eiriksdottir: A Tale of Dreams and Luck (Macmillan of Canada) 
1995: The Dream Carvers (Viking Canada)  (Les sculpteurs de rêves, translated by Catherine Germain (P. Tisseyre, 2004) )
Penguin Canada paperback 
2000: Latitudes of Melt (Knopf Canada) 
Vintage Canada paperback , 
2002: The Word for Home (Viking Canada) 
2005: An Audience of Chairs (Knopf Canada) 
2015: The Birthday Lunch (Knopf Canada)

References

External links
Joan Clark's entry in The Canadian Encyclopedia
Writers Union of Canada: Joan Clark
Famous Canadians: Joan Clark
Memorial University: Address to convocation (4 June 1998)

1934 births
Living people
Canadian children's writers
20th-century Canadian novelists
21st-century Canadian novelists
People from Queens County, Nova Scotia
Writers from Nova Scotia
Writers from St. John's, Newfoundland and Labrador
Canadian women novelists
Acadia University alumni
Canadian women short story writers
Canadian women children's writers
20th-century Canadian women writers
21st-century Canadian women writers
20th-century Canadian short story writers
21st-century Canadian short story writers